Clackmannanshire is a historic county, council area, registration county and Lieutenancy area in Scotland, bordering the council areas of Stirling, Fife, and Perth & Kinross and the historic counties of Perthshire, Stirlingshire and Fife.

The name consists of elements from three languages. The first element is from  meaning "Stone". Mannan is a derivative of the Brythonic name of the Manaw, the Iron Age tribe who inhabited the area. The final element is the English word shire. As Britain's smallest historic county, it is often nicknamed "The Wee County". When written, Clackmannanshire is commonly abbreviated to Clacks.

History

Clackmannan, the old county town, is named after the ancient stone associated with the pre-Christian deity Manau or Mannan. The stone now rests on a larger stone beside the Tollbooth (built late 16th century) and Mercat Cross at the top of Main street, Clackmannan.

Clackmannanshire became known for the weaving mills powered by the Hillfoots burns. Other industries included brewing, glass manufacture, mining and ship building. Now capitalising on its central position and transport links, Clackmannanshire attracts service industries and tourism.

In terms of population, Clackmannanshire is the smallest council area in mainland Scotland. Its population was 19,155 in the 1841 census.

The motto of Clackmannanshire is "Look Aboot Ye" (Circumspice in Latin). In 2007 a re-branding exercise led to the area adopting the slogan "More Than You Imagine".

Administrative and political history

The County of Clackmannan is one of Scotland's 33 historic local government counties, bordering on Perthshire, Stirlingshire and Fife. The county town was originally Clackmannan, but by 1822 neighbouring Alloa had outgrown Clackmannan and replaced it as the county town. Some rationalization of the county boundaries was undertaken in 1889–1890, and in 1971 the Muckhart and Glendevon areas, formerly in Perthshire, were transferred to Clackmannanshire. Clackmannanshire County Council was based at County Buildings in Alloa.

In 1975, under the Local Government (Scotland) Act 1973, the existing burghs and 33 historic counties lost their administrative status, and a new hierarchy of regions and districts was created. Clackmannanshire was renamed the Clackmannan District. It became part of the Central Region, together with a Stirling District and a Falkirk District.

The Local Government etc (Scotland) Act 1994 replaced Scotland's two-tier local government with 32 unitary authorities, with the Clackmannan district becoming one of them. In response to strong local pressure, the first council for the unitary authority changed the name to "Clackmannanshire".

Clackmannanshire played a notable role in the 2014 Scottish independence referendum, where it was the first council area to declare its result. Though some predictions had seen the area as being favourable towards the "Yes" side, the "No" vote took 53.8% of the area's vote. This was seen as an early sign that Scotland would vote against independence.

In the 2016 United Kingdom European Union membership referendum, Clackmannanshire voted by 58% to remain.

Parliamentary constituencies

Pre-United Kingdom (Parliament of Scotland)
Clackmannanshire (1600s to 1707)
UK Parliament
Clackmannanshire (1708 to 1832)
Clackmannanshire and Kinross-shire (1832 to 1918)
Clackmannan and Eastern Stirlingshire (1918 to 1983)
Clackmannan (1983 to 1997)
Ochil (1997 to 2005)
Ochil and South Perthshire (2005 to present)
Scottish Parliament
Ochil (1999 to 2011)
Clackmannanshire and Dunblane (2011 to present)

Council composition

As of September 2018, the political composition of Clackmannanshire Council is:

Wards
Since 2007, the council area has been divided into five multi-member wards:

Geography

The Ochil Hills dominate the northern third of the county, where Ben Cleuch, Clackmannanshire's highest point, can be found. The northernmost salient of the county lies along the Upper Glendevon Reservoir. Strathdevon is immediately to the south of the steep escarpment formed by the Ochil Fault, along which the Hillfoots Villages are located. Strathdevon mostly comprises a lowland plain a few hundred metres either side of the River Devon, which joins the Forth near Cambus. There is also the Black Devon river that flows past the town of Clackmannan to join the Forth near Alloa. This confluence once had a small pier, for portage to Dunmore pier on the south shore, and anchorage of smaller sailing ships, while others of greater tonnage could be accepted at Dunmore pier on the opposite banks of the Forth. Roughly in the centre of the county lies the Gartmorn Dam County Park, and there are small patches of forest in the south-east of the county. Two unnamed peninsulas are formed by meanders in the river Forth along Clackmannanshire's southern boundary; the easternmost of these has two small islands - Tullibody Inch and Alloa Inch - either side of it.

Coat of arms
Clackmannanshire's coat of arms is blazoned:

Or, a saltire gules; upon a chief vert, between two gauntlets proper, a pale argent charged with a pallet sable.

The red saltire on gold is taken from the arms of the Clan Bruce. According to legend, Robert Bruce mislaid his gauntlets while visiting the county, and upon asking where he could find them was told to "look aboot ye" (hence the motto). The green chief represents the county's agriculture, while the black and white pale is taken from the arms of the Clan Erskine whose chief the Earl of Mar lives at Alloa Tower. Sir Thomas Bruce 1st Baron of Clackmannan was a member of the House of Bruce and received lands in Clackmannan from his cousin Robert II.

Economy

The main industries are agriculture, brewing, and formerly coal mining. In 2006, permission was given for a waterfront development of the Docks area of Alloa, which has been in decline since the 1960s. There is a large glass works at Alloa.

Transport
Alloa railway station reopened in May 2008; prior to this the county had no active railway stations. A new railway line was completed which connected Kincardine and Stirling, and thus reconnecting Alloa to the national rail network for the first time since 1968, was opened to the public. Scheduled passenger services operate only between Alloa and Stirling and onwards to Glasgow and Edinburgh; the line to Kincardine is normally used by freight trains only but some special excursion trains are run by charter operators. An opening ceremony was held on Thursday 15 May 2008, with the first fully functioning passenger service commencing in the new summer timetable on 19 May 2008. The service provides an hourly connection between Alloa, Stirling and Glasgow Queen Street.

The Clackmannanshire Bridge, a new road crossing of the Forth intended to ease congestion and pressure on the older Kincardine Bridge, opened in 2008 (technically the span of the new bridge is not within the county, instead falling just outside it and administratively divided between Falkirk and Fife).

Major roads in the area are the A91 between Bannockburn and St Andrews which is the main thoroughfare through the Hillfoots Villages, the A907 between Stirling and Dunfermline which passes through Alloa and Clackmannan, the A908 connecting Alloa and Tillicountry, and the A977 (fed by the A876) between Kincardine and Kinross which runs east of Clackmannan.

Towns and villages

Alloa
Alva
Cambus
Clackmannan
Coalsnaughton
Devonside
Dollar
Fishcross
Forestmill
Glenochil
Inglewood
Kennet
Menstrie
Muckhart (historically in Perthshire)
Sauchie
Solsgirth
Tillicoultry
Tullibody

Places of interest

Alloa Tower
Auchinbaird Windmill
Ben Cleuch
Broomhall Castle
Brucefield House
Castle Campbell
Clackmannan House
Harviestoun Brewery
Gartmorn Dam
Gean House
Menstrie Castle
Tullibody Old Kirk

References

External links
 Clacksweb - Clackmannanshire Council Online

 ClacksNet - Clackmannanshire's Community Network
 Census 2001 Information (PDF)
 National Library of Scotland - Clackmannanshire Map ca. 1681
 Look Aboot Ye - Clackmannanshire Community News, Information and Forums
 ASH Consulting Group 1998. Clackmannanshire landscape character assessment. Scottish Natural Heritage Review No 96.

 
Districts of Scotland
Counties of Scotland
Lieutenancy areas of Scotland
Council areas of Scotland
Counties of the United Kingdom (1801–1922)